GeoArabia is a quarterly peer-reviewed scientific journal covering petroleum geoscience studies in the Middle East. It is published in Bahrain by Gulf PetroLink and was established in 1996. Publications in GeoArabia cover various aspects of geoscience including sedimentology, tectonics, geophysics and petroleum reservoir characterisation.

In October 2018, GeoArabia's electronic library was donated to the non-profit organization GeoscienceWorld to insure that GeoArabia's articles and special publications will remain available to the geoscience community into the far future. The entire GeoArabia library is currently being migrated and will soon become available from their website at https://pubs.geoscienceworld.org/gpl.

Abstracting and indexing 
The journal is abstracted and indexed in:
 GeoRef
 Petroleum Abstracts
 Science Citation Index Expanded
 Current Contents/Physical, Chemical and Earth Sciences
 The Zoological Record
According to the Journal Citation Reports, the journal has a 2010 impact factor of 2.026, ranking it first out of 25 journals in the category "Engineering, Petroleum", and 48th out of 167 journals in the category "Geosciences, Multidisciplinary".

References

External links 
 
https://pubs.geoscienceworld.org/gpl

Quarterly journals
English-language journals
Geology journals
Publications established in 1996
1996 establishments in Bahrain